Tembhli is a village in Nandurbar district of Maharashtra state in India, from where the ambitious Aadhaar Scheme was launched on 29 September 2010. Ranjana Sonawane became the first person to be given an Aadhaar identity number.

External links
 UIDAI article
 UIDAI (or Aadhaar) website)

Villages in Nandurbar district